Teslin River is an unincorporated area in the Yukon Territory, Canada, located on the west bank of the Teslin River at a crossing of that river on the Alaska Highway, about  northwest of the Village of Teslin (Teslin Post), which is on the east shore of Teslin Lake as is the neighbouring community of Teslin Lake.

See also
Teslin (disambiguation)

References

Unincorporated communities in Yukon